Uskovo is a rural locality (a selo) in Kytmanovsky District, Altai Krai, Russia. The population was 56 as of 2013. There is 1 street.

Geography 
Uskovo is located 41 km north of Kytmanovo (the district's administrative centre) by road. Otradnoye is the nearest rural locality.

References 

Rural localities in Kytmanovsky District